The CHL Rookie of the Year Award is given out annually to the top rookie in the Canadian Hockey League. It is chosen from the winners of; the Emms Family Award (OHL Rookie of the Year), the Jim Piggott Memorial Trophy (WHL Rookie of the Year), and the RDS Cup (QMJHL Rookie of the Year).

Winners
List of winners of the CHL Rookie of the Year Award.

See also
 List of Canadian Hockey League awards

References

External links
 CHL Awards – CHL

Canadian Hockey League trophies and awards
Rookie player awards